The 2012 Piala Indonesia was the sixth edition of Piala Indonesia, the nationwide football cup tournament in Indonesia, involving professional clubs from Indonesian Premier League and Premier Division. Sriwijaya FC was the tournament's defending champions. However, the team did not join Piala Indonesia that season due to being one of the Indonesia Super League teams.

Persibo Bojonegoro of East Java won the championship after defeating Semen Padang of West Sumatra in the final.

The cup winner qualified for the 2013 AFC Cup.

Regulation
Each tie in every round, apart from the final, was played over two legs, with each team playing one leg at home. The team with the higher aggregate score over the two legs progressed to the next round. If aggregate scores finished level, then the team that scored more goals away from home over the two legs progressed. If away goals were also equal, 30 minutes of extra time were played. If there were goals scored during extra time and the aggregate score is still level, the visiting team qualified by virtue of more away goals scored. If no goals were scored during extra time, there was a penalty shootout after extra time.

Team allocation 
40 teams participated in the 2012 Piala Indonesia from Indonesian Premier League and Indonesian Premier Division, the top two flights of the Indonesian football league system.
 Indonesian Premier League had 12 teams
 Indonesian Premier Division had 28 teams

Distribution

First round 
The first leg matches were played on 27–28 March and the second leg on 4 April 2012.

First leg

Second leg

Second round 
The first leg matches were played on 11 April and the second legs on 18 April 2012.

First leg

Second leg

Third round 
The first leg matches were played on 9 May and the second leg on 23 May 2012.

First leg

Second leg

Quarter-finals 
The first leg matches were played on 6 June and the second leg on 13 June 2012.

First leg

Second leg

Semi-finals 
The first leg matches were played on 20 June and the second leg on 27 June 2012.

First leg

Second leg

Final

Top goalscorers

See also
 2011–12 Indonesian Premier League
 2011–12 Liga Indonesia Premier Division (LPIS)
 2013 AFC Champions League

References

External links
 2012 Piala Indonesia drawing

2012
Piala Indonesia
Piala Indonesia
2011–12 in Indonesian football